The St. Joseph Syro Malabar Forane Catholic Church is a Syro-Malabar Catholic Forane Parish in Missouri City, Texas serving the community of Houston. It is a Forane Parish for the Syro-Malabar Catholic Eparchy of St. Thomas of Chicago.

Priest 
The current vicar of the Forane Parish is Reverend Fr. Johnykutty George Puleessery. Prior to his tenure in Houston, Fr. Puleessery served as the Chancellor of Syro-Malabar Catholic Eparchy of St. Thomas of Chicago. He also was formerly vicar of St. Thomas Syro-Malabar Forane Catholic Church in Philadelphia, PA.

Importance in the Eparchy 
The Eparchy is the second-largest parish in the eparchy and the largest in the Texas region. Due to its size and importance, It has been granted an assistant vicar. It also hosted the 2019 Syro Malabar National Convention

Forane Church 
In April 2014 Mar Jacob Angadiath announced that the Houston Parish would be elevated to a Forane Church, one of the 9 due to the eparchy's geographical vastness and for better co-ordination.

There are three Syro Malabar Churches and Missions under the St. Joseph Forane, Houston.

See also 

 Syro-Malabar Church
 Syro-Malabar Catholic Eparchy of St. Thomas of Chicago

References 

Syro-Malabar Catholic church buildings
Eastern Catholic church buildings in the United States
Churches in Houston
Indian-American culture in Texas
Missouri City, Texas